Parliamentary elections were held in Hungary on 11 and 25 April 2010 to elect the members of the National Assembly. They were the sixth free elections since the end of the communist era. 386 Members of Parliament (MPs) were elected in a combined system of party lists and electoral constituencies. Electoral law in Hungary requires candidates to gather 500 signatures from citizens supporting their candidacy.

In the first round of the elections, the conservative party Fidesz won the absolute majority of seats, enough to form a government on its own.
In the second round, the alliance of Fidesz and the Christian Democratic People's Party (KDNP) won enough seats to achieve a two-thirds majority required to modify major laws and the country's constitution.

Background 
Fidesz's landslide victory was a result of massive dissatisfaction with the Hungarian Socialist Party (MSZP), which had been in government since 2002. One event that provoked an especially strong backlash was the revelation that the MSZP's Ferenc Gyurcsány, Prime Minister from 2004 to 2009, had admitted in a private speech to party members that he had lied to the general public during the previous election campaign to help his party win re-election. The Őszöd speech, as it came to be called, surfaced in the press during the autumn of 2006 and resulted in nationwide protests.

Polls 
The Hungarian Democratic Forum (MDF) and Alliance of Free Democrats (SZDSZ) entered a limited electoral cooperation agreement after polls suggested that they would be unlikely to make it into parliament independently. In March 2010, polls also indicated that parliament after the election would likely be dominated by Fidesz, polling at 53–67% that month, followed by either the ruling Hungarian Socialist Party at 12–22% or newcomer Jobbik (Movement for a Better Hungary) at 11–18%.

Opinion polls

Controversies
The European Parliament elections of 2009 in Hungary saw the rise of right-wing and far-right parties. This trend was covered negatively by some foreign media outlets that feared the rise of intolerance and xenophobia in the country. In addition, Fidesz Member of Parliament Oszkár Molnár was accused of antisemitism after saying "I love Hungary, I love Hungarians, and I prefer Hungarian interests to global financial capital, or Jewish capital, if you like, which wants to devour the whole world, but especially Hungary." He later said that it was only a response to a speech by President of Israel Shimon Peres in which Peres said that his country aims to "colonise" Hungary when he spoke of Israel's investments abroad, and claimed that Israel was "buying out Manhattan, Poland, Hungary...." Jobbik leader Gábor Vona, also stirred up controversy with allegations of chauvinism by saying "Hungary is for Hungarians" and must be defended against "foreign speculators". Molnár also claimed that the language of instruction in Jerusalem schools was Hungarian and they were "learning the language of their future homeland". His party at the time, Fidesz, did not denounce his statement but simply said it was "embarrassing". Adding that he would not even consider ousting Molnar from his party or parliamentary faction, as the remark "did not violate the party's bylaws". However, in 2010 he was excluded from the Fidesz, due to these remarks. Instead of him, a Lebanese-origin doctor, Pierre Daher became the Fidesz candidate. Molnár also claimed that pregnant Roma women deliberately try to induce birth defects so they can give birth to "fools to receive higher family subsidies. I have checked this and it’s true; they hit their bellies with a rubber hammer so that they’ll give birth to handicapped kids." In 2011, he denounced Roma women at the Hungarian police authorities.

Another Fidesz parliamentarian, Ilona Ékes, wrote to the police to ban a gay pride event in Budapest, saying that homosexuality was a mental illness and demonstrators would scandalise people, as they did in previous years, when homosexual activists imitated sexual intercourse on stage and other activists were allegedly blasphemous. According to Ékes, the demonstrations would harm youngsters, whose school season was to start on the same day.

A Hungarian analyst was cited as saying Fidesz tolerates such provocative rhetoric from its members because of fears they would vote for Jobbik instead.

Foreign interference
Former Jobbik MEP Krisztina Morvai wrote an open letter to Eleni Tsakopoulos Kounalakis, the United States Ambassador to Hungary, alleging foreign interference after the ambassador visited the headquarters of three major parties but not that of Jobbik.

Results

Party list results by county

Turnout
All times are CEST.

Post-election controversies 
Four Jobbik MPs—Gábor Staudt, Gergő Balla, Zsolt Endrésik and Péter Schön—were removed from their committees because they had failed a vetting procedure that asked whether any MP's maintain contact with groups that engage in "activities that deny the basic principles of a state governed by the rule of law." Staudt, a co-founder of the Magyar Gárda Society—that was banned in 2007—had been on the national security committee, while the other three were on the defence and law enforcement committees. Staudt reacted in saying he found the result to be unconstitutional, and that he would file a criminal report with the interior minister against Defence of the Constitution Office director general László Balajti. The four would, however, continue to be MPs.

References

Notes

External links
NSD - European Election Database - Hungary

Elections in Hungary
Hungary
Parliamentary